Patricia Ryan (born 3 March 1969) is an Irish Sinn Féin politician who has been a Teachta Dála (TD) for the Kildare South constituency since the 2020 general election.

Previous to entering politics, Ryan was a trade union shop steward. Between 2019 and 2020 Ryan was a member of Kildare County Council; Noel Connolly was co-opted to Ryan's seat on Kildare County Council following her election to the Dáil.

At the 2020 General Election, Ryan topped the poll in Kildare South, despite taking a holiday during the campaign instead of canvassing. 

In December 2020, Ryan was criticised for having promoted 9/11 conspiracy theories on her Facebook page back in 2015, including a post encouraging people to read a website that stated the US government detonated the Twin Towers in a false flag operation. Ryan later stated "I apologise for this Facebook post. It is not reflective of my views"

In August 2022 Ryan contacted her constituents by post to warn them of potential “significant conflict” between themselves and Ukrainian refugees fleeing the Russo-Ukrainian War if modular homes were allowed to be built in Newbridge. Ryan's letter stated "There is a concern that growing levels of homelessness and pending evictions in the areas where the modular units are being proposed could generate conflict...If this process is not managed right and the views of locally based representatives are not listened to, the potential for significant conflict with host communities is significant, which in turn could be exploited by small far-right elements". Senator Vincent Martin, also based in Kildare, expressed concerned that parts of the letter left "itself open to mixed messaging which has the potential to whip up a cold atmosphere of fear in the local community" The Minister for Integration Roderic O'Gorman stated the modular homes were only a temporary measure being created to meet demand and that his department would engage with communities about any issues concerning refugees.

References

External links
Sinn Féin profile

1969 births
Living people
Local councillors in County Kildare
Members of the 33rd Dáil
21st-century women Teachtaí Dála
Sinn Féin TDs (post-1923)
People from County Laois
Irish trade unionists